Chugha (variant of Shuqa) Persian:چوقا is a coat worn over clothes, usually during the cold winter months. Usually worn by men, these coats are adorned with intricate threading and come in a variety of colors and patterns. It is worn in Iran and Central Asia, including Pakistan, Uzbekistan, Afghanistan, Tajikistan, Kazakhstan, Kyrgyzstan, India and other surrounding countries.

References

Jackets
Pakistani clothing
Indian clothing
Chitrali culture